The 1933–34 season was Madrid Football Club's 32nd season in existence, and their 6th consecutive season in the Primera División. The club also played in the Campeonato Regional Mancomunado (Joint Regional Championship) and the Copa del Presidente de la República (President of the Republic's Cup).

Summary
During summer the club as Incumbent League Champions reinforced the squad with young players such as Mexican midfielder José Ramón Sauto, Villanueva and Emilin. In Autumn the team won the regional championship and by December the Board fired Firth following a landslide defeat 0–5 against Athletic Bilbao. After two matches without coach, in January the Executive Board appointed Francisco Bru as new manager and the squad finished second, two points below Athletic Bilbao.

Meanwhile, in the 1934 Copa del Presidente de la República Madrid reached the final where it faced Valencia Football Club. With a superb performance of Captain Ricardo Zamora, the team clinched its sixth Spanish Cup.

Squad

 (captain)

Transfers

Competitions

La Liga

League table

Results by round

Matches

Campeonato Regional Mancomunado Centro-Sur

Position by round

Matches

Copa del Presidente de la República

Final

Statistics

Player statistics

Notes

References

1933-34
Spanish football clubs 1933–34 season